Events from the year 2006 in South Korea.

Incumbents 
 President: Roh Moo-hyun
 Prime Minister: 
 Lee Hae-chan (until 14 March), 
 Han Myeong-sook (starting 14 March)

Events 
 March 1–4: South Korean railroad strike of 2006
 April: The Saemangeum Seawall is completed
 April 20: Han Myeong Sook becomes prime minister of South Korea, replacing Lee Hae-chan
 May 12: The Korean Paralympic Committee is founded.
 May 31: 2006 South Korean local elections
 July 10: The Aviation and Railway Accident Investigation Board is formed.
 July 21: 43rd Grand Bell Awards
 November 25: 2006 Mnet Asian Music Awards
 December 31: 2006 KBS Drama Awards

Sport
 South Korea at the 2006 Winter Olympics
 South Korea at the 2006 Winter Paralympics
 South Korea at the 2006 Asian Games
 2006 BWF World Junior Championships
 2006 World Junior Curling Championships
 2006 Korea Open
 2006 in South Korean football
 2006 Peace Queen Cup
 2006 AFC Women's Asian Cup

Film
 List of South Korean films of 2006
 List of 2006 box office number-one films in South Korea
 26th Blue Dragon Film Awards

Births

 January 16 - Lim Hyeon-seob, - footballer
 January 20 - Jin Tae-ho, - footballer
 January 26 - Jang Kyu-jin, singer
 January 27 - Kim Su-an, actress 
 February 1 - Yu Byeong-heon, footballer
 March 2 - Kang Min-woo, footballer
 March 12 - Lee Re, child actress 
 March 12 - Lee Chang-woo, footballer
 March 20 - Kim Min-sung, footballer
 March 21 - Kim Myung-jun, footballer
 April 6 - Park Jun-min, footballer
 April 11 - Go Jong-hyeon, footballer
 April 15 - Na Yeong-hoon, footballer
 April 16 - Yang Min-hyuk, footballer
 May 3 - Cha Je-hoon, footballer
 June 18 - Kwak Seong-hoon, footballer
 June 20 - Hwang Ji-sung, footballer
 June 23 - Lee Chae-mi, actress
 August 14 - Kal So-won, actress
 August 27 - Kang Ju-hyeok, footballer
 September 12 - Kim Beom-hwan, footballer
 September 25 - Oh Joo-an, footballer
 September 29 - Hong Seong-min, footballer
 October 10 - Yoon Ki-wok, footballer
 October 28 - Yoon Do-yeong, footballer
 November 17 - Kim Yoo-rae, footballer
 November 29 - Baek In-woo, footballer

Deaths

See also
2006 in South Korean music

References

 
South Korea
South Korea
Years of the 21st century in South Korea
2000s in South Korea